Claudio Scarzanella (born 12 March 1986 in Bagno a Ripoli) is an Italian footballer who plays as a goalkeeper. He played for Ternana during the 2007–08 season.

He spent the 2006–07 Serie B season on loan with F.C. Crotone from Juventus; however, he only featured twice for the club.

References

1986 births
Living people
People from Bagno a Ripoli
Italian footballers
Serie B players
F.C. Crotone players
Ternana Calcio players
Association football goalkeepers
Sportspeople from the Metropolitan City of Florence
Footballers from Tuscany